Abd ol Maleki (also Romanized as ‘Abd ol Malekī) is a village in Razavar Rural District, in the Central District of Kermanshah County, Kermanshah Province, Iran. At the 2006 census, its population was 55, in 11 families.

References 

Populated places in Kermanshah County